Uruguai / Tijuca Station is a station on the Rio de Janeiro Metro that services the neighbourhood of Tijuca in the North Zone of Rio de Janeiro.

The station was opened in 2014, more than 30 years after initially being promised. Uruguai is the first metro station in Rio de Janeiro to be fitted with Wi-Fi for passenger use.

References

Metrô Rio stations
Railway stations opened in 2014
2014 establishments in Brazil